Books and Authors was an Australian television series which aired from December 1956 to 1 September 1957. Broadcast live on Sydney station ATN-7 in a 15-minute time-slot on Sundays, as the title suggests the series focused on the authors of books. It is not known if any of the episodes were kinescoped.

Format
In each episode, Colin Simpson interviewed a different author.

Reception
The Australian Women's Weekly gave the program 2 stars, with reviewer R.C. Packer saying that "although the show is a good one, I can't help wondering why people would want to spend 15 minutes discussing a book or author when they can get just as much out of a book review in five minutes"

Time-slot
The time-slot changed several times during the run of the series. For example, on 3 February 1957 the series aired at 6:45PM, with competition in the time-slot consisting of U.S. western series Hopalong Cassidy on TCN-9, as ABN-2 did not offer any programs between 6:00PM to 7:00PM during that period. By 1 September 1957 Books and Authors aired at 5:45PM, competition in the time-slot consisting of U.S. series Florian Zabach on ABN-2 and locally produced series The N.R.M.A Show on TCN-9.

References

External links

Seven Network original programming
1956 Australian television series debuts
1957 Australian television series endings
Australian non-fiction television series
Australian live television series
Black-and-white Australian television shows
English-language television shows